Jakub Piotr Moder (born 7 April 1999) is a Polish professional footballer who plays as a midfielder for Premier League club Brighton & Hove Albion and the Poland national team. Moder previously played for Lech Poznań.

Club career

Early career 
Moder was born in Szczecinek. He began his steps towards becoming a footballer at Fortuna Wieleń, and in 2011, he joined Warta Poznań as an academy player.

Lech Poznań 
In 2014, Moder joined Lech Poznań's academy, and was promoted to the reserve team in 2016. On 2 April 2018, he made his first team debut for Lech Poznań in a 1–3 win away against Wisła Kraków, coming on as a substitute.

Odra Opole (loan) 
On 18 June 2018, Moder was loaned to I liga side Odra Opole.

2019–20 season 
After returning from his loan spell at Odra Opole, Moder extended his contract with Lech Poznań until 2023, and quickly became a regular starter under Dariusz Żuraw. He got his first assist for Lech Poznań in a 3–1 away win against Górnik Zabrze, and in February 2020, he scored his first goal for 'Kolejorz' in a 3–0 home win against Raków Częstochowa. On 20 June 2020, Moder scored a free-kick from outside the box to help Lech defeat Piast Gliwice in a 2–0 away win. He was voted as the Best Youth Player of the month in Ekstraklasa for June 2020. Moder was an important player for Lech Poznań in the 2019–20 season, helping 'Kolejorz' finish the season in second place.

2020–21 season 
Moder was a key in Lech Poznań's qualification for the 2020–21 UEFA Europa League, providing an assist in a 3–0 home win against Valmiera. On 20 September 2020, Moder scored the winning goal in a 1–0 home win against local rivals Warta Poznań.

Brighton & Hove Albion 
On 6 October 2020 he signed for English club Brighton & Hove Albion for a transfer fee of £6 million.

Lech Poznań (loan) 
Moder was immediately loaned back to former club Lech Poznań, initially until the end of the season (this depended on Lech Poznań's progress in the UEFA Europa League). Despite Lech Poznań's poor start to the 2020–21 Ekstraklasa season, Moder helped the team by scoring 4 goals and providing 2 assists. On 22 October 2020 he made his UEFA Europa League debut, in the 2020–21 group stage home game against Benfica, where Lech was defeated 4–2.

On 18 December, following Lech Poznań's exit from the 2020–21 UEFA Europa League, it was announced that Moder would be recalled from his loan spell on 31 December 2020. Moder made his final appearance for Lech Poznań on 19 December 2020, in a 1–0 home defeat to Wisła Kraków.

2020–21 season 
Moder made his debut for Brighton on 10 February 2021, starting and playing the full match in the 1–0 away defeat against Leicester City in the FA Cup fifth round. He made his Premier League debut on 27 February coming on as a substitute for Ben White in the 84th minute in a 1–0 away loss at West Brom. He made his first start in the league for the Seagulls on 20 March in a 3–0 home win over Newcastle to help Brighton go six points clear of the bottom three.  Moder played in Brighton's 3–2 home victory over champions Manchester City on 18 May, with fans returning to football, in which The Seagulls went from 2–0 down to beat City for the first time in a League game since 1989.

2021–22 season

Moder set up Albion's equaliser with his ball into the box met by a sliding Neal Maupay with Alexis Mac Allister scoring the winner five minutes later in the 2–1 away victory over Burnley on 14 August in the opening game of the 2021–22 season. Moder scored his first Brighton goal, opening the scoring in the 2–0 away victory over Championship side Cardiff City on 24 August, in the EFL Cup second round in what was also his League Cup debut.
He scored his second goal for the Seagulls on 8 January 2022, again coming in cup competition, this time in the FA Cup third round where he scored the equaliser and assisted Neal Maupay's winner in the 2–1 – after extra-time – away victory at Championship side West Bromwich Albion. On 2 April, during the 0–0 home draw against Norwich City, Moder landed awkwardly which resulted in an injury to his anterior cruciate ligament (ACL). As a result, he not only missed the rest of the season but would ruin his hopes of playing at the 2022 World Cup.

International career 
On 4 September 2020, Moder made his first appearance for Poland in a 1–0 defeat to the Netherlands in the UEFA Nations League, coming on as a substitute for Piotr Zielinski. In the absence of Robert Lewandowski, he was given the number 9 shirt on his debut. On 7 October 2020, he made his first full appearance in a 5–1 win against Finland in a friendly match. On 11 November 2020, he scored his first goal for the national team just seconds after coming on as a substitute for Arkadiusz Milik, as Poland defeated Ukraine 2–0 in a friendly match. He scored his second goal for his country capitalising on a John Stones mistake in a 2–1 away loss against England on 31 March 2021 in a 2022 World Cup qualifier.

Moder was named in Poland's 26-man squad for Euro 2020 on 17 May 2021, with the tournament taken place in the summer of 2021 due to the previous year's postponement as a result of Coronavirus. Moder came on as an 85th minute substitute for Leeds United's Mateusz Klich in Poland's opening game against  Slovakia on 13 June,  where The Poles lost 2–1 at the Krestovsky Stadium in Saint Petersburg. He started in Poland's second group match against Spain on 19 June, where he gave away a penalty and was booked. However, Gerard Moreno hit the post, and the match eventually finished at 1–1 at Estadio de La Cartuja in Seville. Moder along with Jan Bednarek of Southampton were out injured for Poland's decisive match against Sweden on 23 June, where Poland lost 3–2 in Saint Petersburg, ending their tournament and finishing bottom of Group E.

Moder would not be called up to the 2022 FIFA World Cup due to his prolonged injury.

Career statistics

Club

International

''As of match played 29 March 2022. Poland score listed first, score column indicates score after each Moder goal.

Honours
Individual
 Polish Ekstraklasa best player: 2020
 Polish Newcomer of the Year: 2020

References

External links

1999 births
Living people
People from Szczecinek
Polish footballers
Association football midfielders
Poland international footballers
Poland under-21 international footballers
Poland youth international footballers
Lech Poznań II players
Lech Poznań players
Odra Opole players
Brighton & Hove Albion F.C. players
Ekstraklasa players
I liga players
II liga players
III liga players
Premier League players
UEFA Euro 2020 players
Polish expatriate footballers
Polish expatriate sportspeople in England
Expatriate footballers in England